Press Corporation Limited, also Press Corporation Plc, is a business conglomerate, partly owned by Press Trust, a sovereign trust fund, of the government of Malawi, that is outside of the direct control of the Malawian government. Press Corporation Limited is the largest conglomerate in Malawi, and has ownership in 15 companies in Malawi, including 8 subsidiaries, 4 joint ventures and one associate company.

Location
The headquarters of the company are located on the 3rd Floor, Press Corporation Limited House, Kaohsiung Road, Blantyre, Malawi. The geographical coordinates of Press Corporation's headquarters are:15°47'33.0"S, 35°00'34.0"E (Latitude:-15.792500; Longitude:35.009444).

Overview
Press Corporation Limited is a business conglomerate that serves as a holding company to fifteen Malawian businesses. It is the largest business conglomerate in the country. As of 31 December 2018, Press Corporation Limited had MWK:271,162,000,000 (US$376 million) worth of assets under management.

History
The company was founded in 1961, as Malawi Press Limited, a publishing Company. The company expanded rapidly, and by 1979 it had stakes in 17 subsidiary companies and 23 associated companies. The rapid expansion however, had been funded by excessive short-term borrowing and soon faced a financial crisis.

In 1983 company was restructured on the orders of the then  president of the country, Hastings Kamuzu Banda. After discussions with the International Monetary Fund and the World Bank, a new company, Press Group Limited, was incorporated on 27 February 1984 in Blantyre as a holding company. Press Corporation Limited was incorporated on the same day, as a 100 percent subsidiary of Press Group Limited.

Press Group Limited, is in turn owned by Press Trust, a sovereign charitable organization in Malawi, incorporated it on 5 March 1982.

Subsidiaries
The list below outlines the subsidiary, joint venture and associate companies of Press Corporation Limited.

 National Bank of Malawi: 51.5 percent shareholding.
 Telekom Networks of Malawi Limited
 Malawi Telecommunications Limited 
 Presscane Limited
 People's Trading Centre Limited
 Press Properties Limited
 Manzini Limited
 The Foods Company Limited
 Open Connect Limited 
 Ethanol Company Limited
 Castel Malawi Limited
 Limbe Leaf Tobacco Company Limited 
 Sunbird Tourism Plc: 10 percent shareholding
 Macsteel Malawi Limited (Joint venture between Press Corporation and Macsteel Service Centers of South Africa) 
 Press Corporation Limited/PUMA Energy International Joint Venture.

Ownership
The shares of stock of Press Corporation Limited are listed on the Malawi Stock Exchange, where they trade under the symbol PCL. The tale below illustrates the major shareholders in the stock of Press Corporation Plc, as at 31 December 2018.

Governance
Patrick W. Khembo is the chairman of the board of directors. George Patridge serves as the Group Chief Executive of the conglomerate.

See also
 List of companies of Ghana
 List of banks in Malawi
 Economy of Malawi

References

External links
 Official Website
  Press Corporation Limited Says Good Leadership vital for Development As of 6 November 2014.

Companies of Malawi
Blantyre
Conglomerate companies established in 1961
1961 establishments in Africa